The Second International Aeronautic Exhibition, 
(full name Second International Aeronautical Exhibition in the league Air Defence of Finland SILI) was held in Helsinki in 1938. It ran from 14 May to 22 May 1938.

It was a special exhibition recognised by the Bureau International des Expositions (BIE) which attracted 25 participating countries including Czechoslovakia, Finland, Germany, Great Britain, Hungary, Latvia, and Sweden; and 15 million visitors and took place in Helsinki's exhibition hall. The commissioners were Alexander Frey, Erik von Frenckell and Mauri Honkajuuri director of Kansallis-Osake-Pankki. Visitors included the racing driver S. P. J. Keinänen and the prime minister Aimo Cajander

Aircraft on display included Morane-Saulnier Type L, Fokker C.X, VL Tuisku and VL Viima.

External links
Official website of the BIE
Film of the exhibition including interior shots, and film of arriving dignitaries (Finnish)

See also
 Finnish Universal Exhibition

References

Air shows
1938 in Finland
1930s in Helsinki
1938 festivals
Finland
May 1938 events